Diario de la Marina was a newspaper published in Cuba, founded by Don Nicolás Rivero in 1832. Diario de la Marina was Cuba’s longest-running newspaper and the one with the highest circulation. Its roots went back to 1813 with El Lucero de la Habana (The Havana Star) and the Noticioso Mercantil (The Mercantile Seer) whose 1832 merger established El Noticioso y Lucero de la Habana, which was renamed Diario de la Marina in 1844. Though a conservative publication, its pages gave voice to a wide range of opinions, including those of avowed communists. It gave a platform to essayist Jorge Mañach and many other distinguished Cuban intellectuals.

Over its long history La Marina represented a conservative philosophy that from 1902 to 1959, opposing the dictatorships of Gerardo Machado in the 1930s and Fulgencio Batista in the 1950s. Its valiant attempt to maintain that tradition of opposition under Castro included being the only newspaper that published the letters denouncing the Castro regime written by Revolutionary Commander Huber Matos from prison after his October 1959 arrest for “counter-revolutionary treason”. 1953, the Diario had a circulation of 28,000 weekdays and 35,000 on Sundays, with 36 to 48 pages, selling for five cents. Its audience was government officials and the upper and middle classes. During 1930-1933, the editorial page cartoonist was Eduardo Abela and during the 1950s it was Jose Manuel Roseñada

The newspaper was published in exile in Miami, Florida, from 1960 until 1961, when it ceased publication.

Soon after the Cuban Revolution led by Fidel Castro that overthrew the Cuban government in 1959, all media - radio, television, and print - underwent a censorship process.  Some communications sources were altered while others were closed. Diario La Marina, due to its anti-Castro position (it had opposed Castro's efforts since well before the revolution) was closed on May 12, 1960, by orders of the government. Armed militiamen and State Security (G2) agents dressed in civilian clothes entered the office premises, expelled employees and vandalized the premises. In-house printers were given a revolutionary tract to publish. The following day, Chief Editor Jose Ignacio Rivero sought political asylum at the Peruvian Embassy. After 128 years, the newspaper had ceased operations.

Other publications
When Prensa Libre wrote critically about the suppression of Diario de la Marina and the imminent loss of freedom of the press in Cuba, it too was seized by the government. Revolutionary mobs, incited by the frenzy of the moment, calling for execution of all the editors who opposed Castro and his Revolution.  One by one, Cuban newspapers ceased publication. Only government-controlled publications, like Revolución, El Mundo, Bohemia, and the communist Hoy were allowed to publish but even they were eventually phased out. After the firm establishment of the regime and the supremacy of the Communist Party, only Granma the official organ of the Cuban Communist Party, was allowed to exist.

References

Further reading

External links
 Diario de la Marina in the Digital Library of the Caribbean

Defunct newspapers published in Cuba
Mass media in Havana
History of Havana
Publications established in 1832
Publications disestablished in 1961
Spanish-language newspapers
1830s establishments in Cuba